Erzingen (Baden) station is a railway station in the Erzingen district of the municipality of Klettgau, located in the Waldshut district in Baden-Württemberg, Germany. The station is located very close to the German border with Switzerland and is the first stop in Germany for passengers travelling away from Schaffhausen and towards Basel.

History
The station building was completed in 1863.

The railway line from Erzingen to Schaffhausen was electrified and tracks along almost the entire route were doubled, allowing for more frequent services to run. The electrification of the line from Erzingen to Waldshut as well as from Waldshut on to Basel Badischer Bahnhof has also been agreed on and is planned.

Train services
 the following services stop at Erzingen (Baden):

The station is a border station and as such is in local transport tariff zones in both Germany and Switzerland.

Customs
Erzingen is, for customs purposes, a border station for passengers arriving from Switzerland. Customs checks may be performed in Erzingen station or on board trains by German officials. Systematic passport controls were abolished when Switzerland joined the Schengen Area in 2008.

Station services
The station building was partially refurbished in 2018. A hotel, café-bakery and dental practice are located in the building.

References

External links

Railway stations in Baden-Württemberg
Buildings and structures in Waldshut (district)